is a song recorded by Japanese singer Aimyon. It was released digitally on February 17, 2021, through Unborde and Warner Music Japan. It was featured as a theme song on AbemaTV's reality show Koi to Ōkami ni wa Damasarenai.

Background and release

On February 3, 2021, Aimyon announced a new single, titled "On a Cherry Blossom Night", scheduled for release on February 17, 2021, to digital music and streaming platforms. It was chosen for AbemaTV's reality show Koi to Ōkami ni wa Damasarenai theme song. Prior to the release, the full version was aired for the first time at Tokyo FM's School of Lock! on February 3. An accompanying music video of "On a Cherry Blossom Night", directed by Tomokazu Yamada, was uploaded on March 5, a month after the song release. The song was combined with "Till I Know What Love Is (I'm Never Gonna Die)" and released as a double A-side CD single on May 26.

Track listing

Digital download, streaming – standalone
  – 4:34

CD single, digital download, streaming – double A-side
  – 4:36
 "On a Cherry Blossom Night" – 4:34
  – 2:48
 "Till I Know What Love Is (I'm Never Gonna Die)" (instrumental) – 4:36
 "On a Cherry Blossom Night" (instrumental) – 4:33

Charts

Weekly charts

Monthly charts

Year-end charts

Certifications

Release history

References

External links
  

2021 singles
2021 songs
Aimyon songs
Japanese-language songs
Warner Music Japan singles
Unborde singles